Acanthostachys strobilacea is a plant species in the genus Acanthostachys. This species is native to Brazil, Paraguay and Argentina.

References

Bromelioideae
Flora of Brazil